Luis Miguel Gail Martín (23 February 1961) is a Spanish former football central defender and manager.

He amassed La Liga totals of 266 matches and 29 goals over one full decade, representing Valladolid and Betis.

Club career
Gail was born in Valladolid, Castile and León. After emerging through their youth ranks, he made his senior debut for local club Real Valladolid at only 16. He first appeared in La Liga in the 1980–81 campaign, competing with the side in that level in six straight seasons, scoring 51 competitive goals and helping to the conquest of the (short-lived) Copa de la Liga in his final year, against Atlético Madrid.

In summer 1986, Gail joined Real Betis also in the top division. He totalled nine goals in the league in his first two years but also suffered relegation to Segunda División twice, eventually retiring from professional football at only 30.

Gail took up coaching subsequently, but never in higher than Segunda División B.

Honours
Valladolid
Copa de la Liga: 1984

References

External links

1961 births
Living people
Footballers from Valladolid
Spanish footballers
Association football defenders
Association football utility players
La Liga players
Segunda División players
Real Valladolid Promesas players
Real Valladolid players
Real Betis players
Spain youth international footballers
Spanish football managers
Segunda División B managers
CE Sabadell FC managers
Xerez CD managers
Zamora CF managers